Tony Asimakopoulos is a  Canadian film and television director based in Montreal. He often collaborates with the Montreal-based Canadian film production company EyeSteelFilm. He is best known for his autobiographical documentary Fortunate Son, about his relationship with his immigrant parents, which was one of the highest-grossing theatrical documentaries in Quebec in 2012.

Career
Antonios Asimakopoulos was born and raised in Montreal to Greek immigrant parents, Aristomenis and Vassiliki Asimakopoulos. He studied at Montreal's Concordia University, and earned a degree in film production in 1993. His short film Jimmy Fingers was awarded the "Prix de le Rélève", for most promising Quebec filmmaker, at the 1991 Festival de jeune cinema in Montreal. This was followed by his short Mama's Boy, which screened at the Toronto International Film Festival and in Montreal, Locarno, Gothenburg and Melbourne.

He moved to Ottawa in 1995 to enter treatment for drug addiction and alcoholism. There, he helped develop and teach a video apprenticeship program for youth-at-risk, at the SAW Video Co-op, from 1997 to 2001. He was also featured in the documentary Confessions of a Rabid Dog directed by a fellow recovering addict, John L'Ecuyer.

After resuming his own work with Horsie's Retreat, a dramatic feature made at the Canadian Film Centre in 2004, he returned home to Montreal to work on the Global docudrama series Canadian Case Files (2005–2006), as an editor and director.

His involvement with EyeSteelFilm began with their ground-breaking 2009 documentary RiP!: A Remix Manifesto, which he edited. With them, he went on to make Fortunate Son, which played numerous worldwide festivals including Amsterdam (IDFA), Thessaloniki, the Montreal Festival du Nouveau Cinema, and the Los Angeles, Chicago, London and Sydney Greek Film Festival.

His latest doc, Return To Park Ex/ ""Retour À Parc-Ex"" (Canal D), premiered in English on the award-winning program CBC DOCS:POV in October 2018.

Asimakopoulos has also directed several comedy videos for the CBC Radio One program WireTap.

Filmography
Director
1991: Jimmy Fingers (short)
1992: Mama's Boy (short)
2005: Horsie's Retreat
2005: Canadian Case Files (TV series)
2011: Fortunate Son (documentary)
2014: A Xmas Memory (fiction short)
2017: Return To Park Ex / Retour À Parc-Ex (documentary)

Cinematographer
2011: Fortunate Son (documentary)
2017: Return To Park Ex (documentary)

Screenwriter
2005: Horsie's Retreat

Editor
1999: No One Believes the Professor (documentary short)
1999: Voices of Dissent: A Dance of Passion (short)
2005: Horsie's Retreat
2005: Canadian Case Files (TV series)
2007: Imitation
2007: Family Motel
2009: RiP!: A Remix Manifesto (documentary)
2011: Fortunate Son (documentary)
2017: Return To Park Ex (documentary)

References

External links
Tony Asimakopoulos page on EyeSteelFilm website

Xmas Memory at Vimeo

Canadian people of Greek descent
Film directors from Montreal
Living people
Year of birth missing (living people)